The canton of Annecy-2 is an administrative division of the Haute-Savoie department, southeastern France. It was created at the French canton reorganisation which came into effect in March 2015. Its seat is in Annecy.

It consists of the following communes:
Annecy (partly) 
Sevrier

References

Cantons of Haute-Savoie